Winnetou and the Crossbreed (German: Winnetou und das Halbblut Apanatschi) is a 1966 West German Western film directed by Harald Philipp and starring Lex Barker, Pierre Brice, Götz George and Uschi Glas. It is part of the series of Karl May adaptations produced by Rialto Film during the decade. It was co-produced with Italy and Yugoslavia. The budget was an estimated three and a half million Deutschmarks.

This was the first in the series to not be based on a May novel, only on his characters. It was not a box office success, unlike previous releases which had been major hits. However, it did launch the career of Uschi Glas as an important actress.

It was shot at the Spandau Studios in Berlin and on location in Yugoslavia. The film's sets were designed by Vladimir Tadej.

Cast
 Lex Barker as Old Shatterhand
 Pierre Brice as Winnetou
 Götz George as Jeff Brown
 Uschi Glas as Apanatschi
 Walter Barnes as Mac Haller
 Ralf Wolter as Sam Hawkens
 Miha Baloh as Judge
 Marija Crnobori as Mine-Yota
  as Curly-Bill
 Marinko Cosic as Happy
 Petar Dobric as Sloan
 Vladimir Leib as Pincky
 Abdurrahman Shala as Hank
 Nada Kasapic as Bessie
 Giancarlo Bastianoni

References

Bibliography 
 Bergfelder, Tim. International Adventures: German Popular Cinema and European Co-Productions in the 1960s. Berghahn Books, 2005.

External links 
 
 Winnetou and the Crossbreed at filmportal.de/en

1966 films
1966 Western (genre) films
1960s historical films
Constantin Film films
Films directed by Harald Philipp
Films set in New Mexico
Films set in the 19th century
Films shot at Spandau Studios
German Western (genre) films
German historical films
1960s German-language films
Italian Western (genre) films
Italian historical films
West German films
Winnetou films
Yugoslav Western (genre) films
Yugoslav historical films
1960s Italian films
1960s German films
Foreign films set in the United States